Huon Valley Council is a local government body in Tasmania, covering most of the south of the state. Huon Valley is classified as a rural local government area and has a population of 17,219, towns and localities of the region include Cygnet, Dover, Franklin, Geeveston, Southport and the largest principal town, Huonville.

History and attributes
In 1993 the municipalities of Esperance, Huon and Port Cygnet were amalgamated to form the Huon Valley Council. Remote subantarctic Macquarie Island, which is located some 1400 km southeast of Tasmania proper, was part of Esperance until then, and has been administratively part of the Huon Valley since then.

Demographics
Huon Valley is classified as rural, agricultural and very large under the Australian Classification of Local Governments.

The townships in the south east region of Tasmania that experienced the largest growth over the decade ending June 2011 were Huonville, Franklin (where the population was up by 1,300 people) and Cygnet (up by 440).

Localities

Bishop and Clerk Islets

Castle Forbes Bay

Eggs and Bacon Bay

Glen Huon

Macquarie Island

Pelverata

Southwest

Elections
The Huon Valley Council is composed of nine Councillors elected using the Hare-Clark system of proportional representation as a single ward. All Councillors are elected for a fixed four-year term of office. The Mayor and Deputy Mayor are each directly elected for a four-year term. The Mayor and Deputy Mayor must also be elected as Councillors to hold office. Elections are normally held in October, with the next election due to be held in October 2022. Neither the Labor Party nor the Liberal Party endorse local government candidates in Tasmania.

In 2016 the entire Huon Valley Council was sacked by the state government after a long period of severe dysfunction. and the municipality was controlled by a Commissioner, former Glenorchy mayor and Elwick MLC Adriana Taylor, until new elections were held over a three-week period concluding on 30 October 2018.

As elected in 2022 the Council had 9 members:

See also

List of local government areas of Tasmania

References

Further reading
 Tyson, Nell. and Rushton, Annie (1995) Family bushwalks in Tasmania's Huon valley Dover, Tas.: Driftwood Publishing.

External links

Huon Valley Council official website
Local Government Association Tasmania
Tasmanian Electoral Commission - local government

Local government areas of Tasmania
Southern Tasmania
 
South West Tasmania